Phil Zajicek (born March 20, 1979) of Eugene, Oregon, is an American ex-professional road racing cyclist who last rode professionally for the Fly V Australia Team in 2010. On June 10, 2011, the US Anti-Doping Agency (USADA) announced that Zajicek had accepted a life-ban from competition.

Career summary
Zajicek, a former Junior National Champion, and a Boulder, Colorado, resident, competed throughout the United States and was known as one of the country's top domestic riders, finishing ahead of Lance Armstrong and Levi Leipheimer in Stage 5 of the 2009 Tour of the Gila. Climbing nearly 10,000 feet over 100 miles, through the Continental Divide and the high desert plains and mountains of New Mexico, Zajicek was the only athlete able to match and set pace with Armstrong and Leipheimer, besting both by multiple bicycle lengths in the final uphill sprint, after nearly 5 hours of aggressive racing as Armstrong and Leipheimer prepared for that year's Tour de France, two months later, where Armstrong finished third overall.  Stage 5 of the Tour of the Gila, also known as the "Gila Monster Stage", is widely believed to be the most difficult road course in the United States. Zajicek also extensively competed in many of the world's toughest and most renowned Pro Tour Road Races, such as the Midi Libre, Biciclista Vasca, Classique des Alpes, Dauphine Libre, Route du Sud, GP Plouay, and the Tour de L’avenir. Zajicek was a key rider in 2005 for the U.S. National Team during the UCI World Championships in Madrid, Spain. For 2011, Zajicek signed a lucrative  professional contract for the ill-fated Pegasus Professional Cycling Team Project, but was left without a team after the Australian squad was denied a Professional UCI License.

Doping
In 2004, USADA reported that Zajicek tested positive for cathine (norpseudoephedrine), at the Tour of Qinghai Lake on July 22, 2004, in China. Zajicek, then 25, was disqualified from his first-place overall finish at the race and fined 666 Swiss francs, but he did not draw a suspension from competition Zajicek steadfastly denied any intention to dope and claimed he consumed an over-the-counter cold medicine that metabolized into a prohibited substance. Cathine is the metabolite of a legal supplement and USADA agreed with this analysis, subsequently modifying their protocols for testing norpsuedoephedrine from 2004 onward.

On June 10, 2011, USADA announced that had Zajicek accepted a life-ban from competition due to alleged doping violations. According to USADA CEO Travis T. Tygart, Zajicek also pleaded no contest to a second doping violation for allegedly purchasing erythropoietin (EPO), and pleaded no contest to a third doping offense for allegedly providing false testimony at an American Arbitration Association ("AAA") hearing. The AAA is a private enterprise in the business of arbitrating civil disagreements and is not a court of law, nor does the AAA have any judicial powers. Zajicek was also accused of allegedly encouraging other witnesses to provide inaccurate testimony. Zajicek was fined $5,000, though neither the USADA nor the AAA has any means of collecting funds from athletes. Therefore, it is unlikely Zajicek will ever be required to pay the sum in question, unless he voluntarily decides to pay the fine.

Palmares
"As a result of the sanction, Zajicek is also disqualified from all competitive results obtained on and subsequent to April 24, 2007, including forfeiture of any medals, points, and prizes."

2009
 1st       Stage 5 Tour of the Gila
 1st       Stage 2 La Vuelta de Bisbee
 2nd       Stage 1 La Vuelta de Bisbee
 2nd       Stage 4a Tour de Beauce
 2nd       Stage 4 Cacade Cycling Classic
 3rd       overall Tour of the Gila
 3rd       Iron Horse Bicycle Classic Road Race
 7th       USPRO Time Trial Championships
 8th       USPRO Road Race Championships

2008
 1st       Sunshine Hill Climb
 2nd       Stage 2 Tour of the Gila
 10th      Overall Tour of Utah

2007
 2nd       overall Redlands
 13th      US Open
 5th       overall La Vuelta de Bisbee
 1st       North Boulder Park Crit
 1st       Ironhorse Bike Classic
 2nd       overall Mt Hood
 4th       overall Nature Valley Grand Prix
 1st       overall Cascade Cycling Classic

2006
 8th overall Redlands
 5th overall Tour of the Gila
 1st overall La Vuelta de Bisbee
 2nd overall Mt Hood
 1st stage three Mt Hood
 7th overall Tour de Nez
 3rd overall Fitchburg
 8th US National Road Race Championships
 4th overall Sun Tour

2005
 4th overall Tour of Britain (UCI 2.1)
 2nd stage 1 Cascade Classic
 7th stage 4 TT Cascade Classic

2004
 1st overall Tour of QingHai Lake(yellow jersey 4 days)
 3rd stage 5 QingHai Lake
 4th Nevada City
 9th National Time Trial Championships
 12th overall Tour of Georgia
 13th overall Cascade
 23rd overall Tour Down Under

2003
 4th Montreal Quebec
 7th Fitchburg
 11th Sea Otter
 12th Tour of Georgia
 32nd Peace Race

2002
 1st stage one TT Fitchburg
 2nd stage 6 Tour de Beauce
 4th Stage 4 TT Tour de Beauce
 7th overall Tour de Beauce
 9th Saturn Cycling Classic

2001
 1st Sprint Competition National Crit Championships
 7th BMC Austin Criterium

Riding injury
Zajicek had a serious crash in March 2016 while descending Flagstaff Mountain in Boulder, Colorado. His arm was completely severed along with numerous other injuries.

See also
 List of doping cases in cycling
 List of sportspeople sanctioned for doping offences

References

External links
 Official Rider Blog
 
 
 
 

1979 births
Living people
American male cyclists
Doping cases in cycling
Sportspeople from Eugene, Oregon
Sportspeople from Boulder, Colorado